= 1951 Saga gubernatorial election =

Election for Governor of Saga Prefecture

← 1947	30 April 1951	1955 →
Nominee	Naotsugu Nabeshima	Gen'ichi Okimori
Party	Independent	Independent
Popular vote	314,356	137,089
Governor before election
Gen'ichi Okimori
Independent
Elected Governor
Naotsugu Nabeshima
Independent

A gubernatorial election was held on 30 April 1951 to elect the Governor of Saga Prefecture. Incumbent Gen'ichi Okimori lost the election to Naotsugu Nabeshima, who subsequently became his successor.

== Candidates ==
- Naotsugu Nabeshima – Member of the House of Peers, age 38
- Gen'ichi Okimori – incumbent Governor of Saga Prefecture, age 51

== Results ==
Saga Gubernational Election 1951
Party	Candidate	Votes	%	±%
Independent	Naotsugu Nabeshima	314,356		
Independent	Gen'ichi Okimori	137,089		
